The Windmill Point Light was a lighthouse built in 1838 at the confluence of the Detroit River and Lake St. Clair in the U.S. state of Michigan. It was funded by a Congressional appropriation of $5,000 in March 1837. The current structure, which dates from 1933, has an octagonal base made of concrete which is one story tall, topped by a 33-foot cylindrical white steel-plate tower. The total height of the structure is 45 feet. The first lighthouse keeper was John Martin, a veteran of the War of 1812.

References

Lighthouses